Bishop Bishop may refer to:

William Bishop (bishop) (–1624), Roman Catholic Vicar Apostolic of England
Jim Bishop (bishop) (1908–1994), Anglican Bishop suffragan of Malmesbury
John Climping (d. 1262), medieval Catholic Bishop of Chichester, was also known as "John Bishop"